M3 Parkway is a Park and Ride railway station in County Meath beside Dunboyne and the M3 Motorway (Pace Interchange Junction 5).

It is the terminus station on the Docklands to M3 Parkway Western Commuter service (during peak times Monday to Friday) and Clonsilla to M3 Parkway shuttle Commuter service at all other times.

It mainly serves as a large Park and Ride site, with 1,200 free car park spaces.

The station is no longer served by any bus routes. This is a major drawback for commuters in its catchment area.

History
In 2005, the Irish Government announced that, as part of its Transport 21 plan, the line between Clonsilla and Navan would be reopened for passenger trains in two stages. This line had closed in 1963. Phase 1 of this project from Clonsilla to M3 Parkway, the terminus until Phase 2 opens to Navan.

M3 Parkway opened on 3 September 2010, as part of phase one of the Navan rail line reopening.

Services
Peak Times Monday to Friday : Passengers can travel directly between M3 Parkway and Dunboyne, Hansfield, Clonsilla, Coolmine, Castleknock, Navan Road Parkway, Ashtown, Broombridge, and Docklands.

All other times including all day Saturday and Sunday : Passengers can travel directly between M3 Parkway and Dunboyne, Hansfield, and Clonsilla but need to transfer at Clonsilla for services to Maynooth or Dublin city centre in order to  travel to any other stations.

The station is no longer served by any buses.

Station name
There was uncertainty over the station's name, as it variously appears as Pace M3, M3 Park and Ride, and Pace (M3 Park and Ride). Unlike the preceding Dunboyne station, there was no previous station at this location. Since the Summer of 2010, signs in the station display the current name M3 Parkway.

See also
 List of railway stations in Ireland

References

External links

Irish Rail M3 Parkway Station Website

Railway stations opened in 2010
Iarnród Éireann stations in County Meath